Eury Eduardo Pérez (born May 30, 1990) is a Dominican professional baseball outfielder for the Sioux City Explorers of the American Association of Professional Baseball. He has played in Major League Baseball (MLB) for the Washington Nationals, New York Yankees, and Atlanta Braves.

Professional career

Washington Nationals
Pérez participated in the 2010 All-Star Futures Game. After the 2011 season, the Nationals added Pérez to their 40-man roster to protect him from the Rule 5 draft.  He is regarded as a speedy outfielder with limited power and emerging hitting ability.  In 2012, he broke out with the bat across multiple minor league levels, batting .314.  His speed is also well discussed, as he stole 64 bases for Hagerstown in 2010 and 54 in 2012 for GCL, Harrisburg,  Syracuse, and Washington.

Pérez was brought up by the Nationals from the Triple-A Syracuse Chiefs on May 11, 2013 when Jayson Werth was placed on the disabled list.

On September 18, 2014, Pérez was designated for assignment by the Nationals.

New York Yankees
On September 22, 2014 Pérez was claimed off waivers by the New York Yankees. On January 16, 2015, the Yankees designated Pérez for assignment.

Atlanta Braves
On January 23, 2015, the Atlanta Braves claimed Pérez off waivers from the Yankees. He was invited to spring training, and optioned to Triple–A Gwinnett on March 27. He was recalled to the major league club on June 18.

Houston Astros / Tampa Bay Rays
Pérez signed a minor league deal with the Houston Astros organization in January 2016. He was traded to the Tampa Bay Rays on June 23, 2016 and assigned to their AAA club the Durham Bulls.

Pittsburgh Pirates
On December 16, 2016, Pérez signed a minor league contract with the Pittsburgh Pirates that included an invitation to spring training. While playing for Pittsburgh's AAA affiliate the Indianapolis Indians in 2017, Perez batted .336/.400/.433, with 22 steals in 50 games before being traded on August 3, 2017 to the Miami Marlins.

Miami Marlins
Upon being acquired by the Miami Marlins, Perez was assigned to their AAA club the New Orleans Baby Cakes.  He elected free agency on November 6, 2017.

San Francisco Giants
Perez signed a minor league deal with the Giants on February 23, 2018, though he became a free agent after the season.

Guerreros de Oaxaca
On March 1, 2019, Perez signed with the Guerreros de Oaxaca of the Mexican League. He was released on April 13, 2019 he appeared in 3 games and slashed .400/.455/.900 with 1 home run and 2 RBIs.

Olmecas de Tabasco
On April 15, 2019, Perez signed with the Olmecas de Tabasco of the Mexican League. He was released on May 25, 2019, appearing in 28 games hitting .353/.409/.431 with 0 home runs and 13 RBIs.

Sioux City Explorers
On December 9, 2020, Pérez signed with the Sioux City Explorers of the American Association of Professional Baseball. On July 10, 2021, Pérez was released by Sioux City without having appeared in a game for the team.

Wild Health Genomes
On August 16, 2022, Pérez signed with the Wild Health Genomes of the Atlantic League of Professional Baseball. He appeared in 17 games, slashing .400/.446/.553 with no home runs and 6 RBI.

Sioux City Explorers
On February 23, 2023, Pérez signed with the Sioux City Explorers of the American Association of Professional Baseball.

References

External links

1990 births
Living people
Arizona League Giants players
Atlanta Braves players
Dominican Republic expatriate baseball players in Mexico
Dominican Republic expatriate baseball players in the United States
Dominican Summer League Nationals players
Gwinnett Braves players
Guerreros de Oaxaca players
Gulf Coast Nationals players
Hagerstown Suns players
Harrisburg Senators players
Indianapolis Indians players

Leones del Escogido players
Major League Baseball outfielders
Major League Baseball players from the Dominican Republic
Mexican League baseball center fielders
Mexican League baseball right fielders
New Orleans Baby Cakes players
New York Yankees players
Olmecas de Tabasco players
People from Santo Domingo Province
Potomac Nationals players
Sacramento River Cats players
Syracuse Chiefs players
Washington Nationals players
World Baseball Classic players of the Dominican Republic
Yaquis de Obregón players
2013 World Baseball Classic players